Gamal Fathy (born 29 January 1985) is an Egyptian sabre fencer. Fathy represented Egypt at the 2008 Summer Olympics in Beijing, where he competed in two sabre events. For his first event, the men's individual sabre, Fathy lost the first preliminary round match to Canada's Philippe Beaudry, with a score of 8–15. Few days later, he joined with his fellow fencers and teammates Tamim Ghazy, Shadi Talaat, and Mahmoud Samir for the men's team sabre. Fathy and his team, however, lost the seventh place match to the Hungarian team (led by Áron Szilágyi), with a total score of 25 touches.

References

External links
Profile – FIE
NBC Olympics Profile

Egyptian male sabre fencers
Living people
Olympic fencers of Egypt
Fencers at the 2008 Summer Olympics
1985 births
20th-century Egyptian people
21st-century Egyptian people